Barabinsk is a town in Novosibirsk Oblast, Russia, located in the Baraba steppe on the Trans-Siberian Railway between Omsk and Novosibirsk. Population:

History
It was founded at the end of the 19th century and was granted town status in 1917.

Administrative and municipal status
Within the framework of administrative divisions, Barabinsk serves as the administrative center of Barabinsky District, even though it is not a part of it. As an administrative division, it is incorporated separately as the Town of Barabinsk—an administrative unit with the status equal to that of the districts. As a municipal division, the Town of Barabinsk is incorporated within Barabinsky Municipal District as Barabinsk Urban Settlement.

Economy
The most important economic sectors are the production of building material as well as metal and agricultural industries.

Climate
Barabinsk has a humid continental climate (Köppen climate classification Dfb), with very cold winters and warm summers. Precipitation is quite low, but is somewhat higher from June to September than at other times of the year.

Notable residents 

Anatoly Marchenko (1938–1986), Soviet dissident
Alexandr Shiplyuk (born 1966), scientist

References

Notes

Sources

External links
Official website of Barabinsk 
Directory of organizations in Barabinsk 

Cities and towns in Novosibirsk Oblast